The Roman Catholic Diocese of Santa Marta is a diocese located in the city of Santa Marta in the Ecclesiastical province of Barranquilla in Colombia.

History
 January 10, 1534: Established as Diocese of Santa Marta from the Diocese of Santo Domingo in the Dominican Republic

Bishops

Ordinaries
 Alfonso de Tobes (Appointed 1534 - Did Not Take Effect)
 Juan Fernando Angulo (1536–1542 Died)
 Martín de Calatayud (1543–1548 Died)
 Juan de los Barrios (1552–1564 Appointed Archbishop of Santafé en Nueva Granada)
 Juan Méndez de Villafranca (1577–1577 Died)
 Sebastián Ocando (1579–1619 Died)
 Leonel de Cervantes y Caravajal (1621–1625 Appointed Bishop of Santiago de Cuba)
 Lucas García Miranda (1625–1629 Died)
 Antonio Corderiña Vega (1630–1640 Resigned)
 Juan de Espinoza y Orozco (1642–1651 Died)
 Francisco de la Cruz (1658–1660 Died)
 Francisco de la Trinidad Arrieta (1661–1663 Died)
 Melchor de Liñán y Cisneros (1664–1668 Appointed Bishop of Popayán)
 Lucas Fernández de Piedrahita (1668–1676 Appointed Bishop of Panamá)
 Diego de Baños y Sotomayor (1677–1683 Appointed Bishop of Caracas, Santiago de Venezuela)
 Gregorius Jacobus Pastrana (1684–1690 Died)
 Juan Víctores de Velasco (1694–1707 Appointed Bishop of Trujillo)
 Ludovicus de Gayoso (1713–1713 Died)
 Antonio Monroy y Meneses (1715–1738 Resigned)
 José Ignacio Mijares Solórzano y Tobar (1740–1742 Died)
 Juan Nieto Polo del Aguila (1743–1746 Confirmed Bishop of Quito)
 José Javier de Arauz y Rojas (1746–1753 Confirmed Archbishop of Santafé en Nueva Granada)
 Nicolás Gil Martínez y Malo (1755–1763 Died)
 Agustín Manuel Camacho y Rojas (1764–1771 Appointed Archbishop of Santafé en Nueva Granada)
 Francisco Javier Calvo (1771–1773 Died)
 Francisco Navarro (1775–1788 Died)
 Anselmo José de Fraga y Márquez (1790–1792 Died)
 José Alejandro de Egües y Villamar (1792–1796 Died)
 Diego Santamaría Cevallos (1798–1801 Died)
 Eugenio Sesé, C.R.S.A. (1801–1803 Died)
 Miguel Sánchez Cerrudo (1804–1810 Died)
 Manuel Redondo y Gómez (1811–1813 Died)
 Antonio Gómez Polanco (1817–1820 Died)
 José María Estévez (1827–1834 Died)
 José Luis Serrano (1836 Appointed – 12 May 1852 Died)
 Bernabé Rojas (1854–1858 Died)
 Vicente Arbeláez Gómez (1859–1864 Appointed Coadjutor Archbishop of Santafé en Nueva Granada)
 José Romero (1864–1891 Died)
 Rafael Celedón (1891–1902 Died)
 Francisco Simón y Ródenas (1904–1912 Resigned)
 Francisco Cristóbal Toro (1913–1917 Appointed Bishop of Antioquía-Jericó)
 Joaquín Garcia Benitez (1917–1942 Appointed Archbishop of Medellín)
 Bernardo Botero Álvarez (1944–1956 Appointed Archbishop of Nueva Pamplona)
 Norberto Forero y García (1956–1971 Retired)
 Javier Naranjo Villegas (1971–1980 Resigned)
 Félix María Torres Parra (1980–1987 Appointed  Archbishop of Barranquilla)
 Hugo Eugenio Puccini Banfi (1987–2014 Retired)
 Luis Adriano Piedrahíta Sandoval (2014–2021 Died)
 José Mario Bacci Trespalacios, C.I.M. (since 2021)

Auxiliary bishops
Pedro José Rivera Mejía (1951-1953), appointed Bishop of Socorro y San Gil
Alfredo Rubio Diaz (1953-1956), appointed Bishop of Girardot

Other priests of this diocese who became bishops
Salvador Bermúdez y Becerra, appointed Bishop of Concepción in 1731
Luis Gabriel Ramírez Díaz (priest here, 1993-2006), appointed Bishop of El Banco in 2014
Miguel Fernando González Mariño, appointed Auxiliary Bishop of Ibagué in 2016

See also
 Roman Catholicism in Colombia

References

External links
 Catholic Hierarchy
 GCatholic.org

Santa Marta
1534 establishments in the Spanish Empire
Roman Catholic dioceses in Colombia
Roman Catholic Ecclesiastical Province of Barranquilla
Religious organizations established in the 1530s
Roman Catholic dioceses established in the 16th century